The 1949 Texas hurricane was a tropical cyclone of the 1949 Atlantic hurricane season. Forming in the Pacific Ocean on September 27, the storm crossed into the Gulf of Mexico—one of only a handful of known storms to do so—and began to intensify. It ultimately peaked with winds corresponding to high-end Category 2 status on the modern-day Saffir–Simpson hurricane scale and made landfall near Freeport, Texas, on the morning of October 4. It rapidly weakened after moving inland and dissipated several days later. Damage from the storm was moderate, although the hurricane temporarily cut off the city of Galveston from the mainland. Rice crops suffered extensive damage, with losses estimated at up to $10 million (1949 USD$,   USD). Two people died due to the hurricane.

Meteorological history

According to modern-day analysis, a tropical depression developed in the Pacific Ocean, south of El Salvador, early on September 27. It drifted northward across Central America and eastern Mexico before emerging into the Gulf of Mexico near Ciudad del Carmen on September 30. Weather reports had indicated low air pressures over the area for several days. It is relatively rare for a tropical cyclone to cross from the Pacific into the Atlantic, or vice versa, and this storm is among less than a dozen known to have officially done so. Only three other tropical cyclones have crossed from the eastern Pacific into the Gulf of Mexico.

The cyclone intensified into a tropical storm on October 1 and sped up slightly as it curved northwestward. A day later it became a hurricane. The storm is one of a relatively few October hurricanes to either impact or make landfall in Texas. After significantly weakening, it passed directly over Houston; the next storm to do so would be Hurricane Alicia in 1983.

Upon moving inland, the hurricane quickly degraded into a tropical storm within six hours of making landfall. It turned northeastward as it continued through the central United States, weakening to a tropical depression by October 5. It became extratropical the next day, yet persisted until October 7, when it is believed to have dissipated near Sheboygan, Wisconsin.

Preparations and impact

Throughout 10 cities in Texas, 50,000 sought shelter in advance of the hurricane. An estimated 28,000 residents fled to shelters; around 5,000 stayed in the Houston City Auditorium. Tropical cyclone watches and warnings were issued along coastal areas of Texas and Louisiana. Pioneer Airlines removed its aircraft from Houston, while small watercraft were kept safe in port. Schools in Corpus Christi closed by October 3, as well as businesses in the threatened area.

Urban areas sustained generally light damage. In Houston, the winds shattered some store windows and distributed debris. Galveston was temporarily cut off from the mainland during the hurricane when water surpassed the city's seawall. The hurricane spawned a minor tornado which struck the community of Riceville, injuring on two children. Freeport reportedly suffered the worst damage, costing approximately $150,000.

A pier at Port Aransas was largely destroyed at a cost of $10,000. The hurricane caused extensive damage to rice, cotton, and vegetable crops in the region. An estimate several days after the storm placed the total quantity of rice damaged at 500,000 bushels, totaling $10 million in monetary losses. However, Zoch (1949) reported that total damage from the storm was $6.7 million. Following the storm, thousands of automobiles in six states were affected by widespread peeling and blistering paint. The blisters, usually concentrated on the hoods, fenders and tops of vehicles, contained a small amount of water, and peeling paint was also reported on one Shreveport home. Most of the cars damaged were parked outside, and sheltered automobiles were unaffected. Although total damage from the phenomenon may have reached thousands of dollars, experts were unable to identify its cause immediately following the storm. Two deaths were attributed to the storm: a resident of Port Neches who was electrocuted, and a young woman who drowned in Matagorda Bay.

See also

List of Texas hurricanes (1900–1949)
List of Atlantic–Pacific crossover hurricanes

References

Sources

Hurricanes in Texas
Texas Hurricane, 1949
1940s Pacific hurricane seasons
1949 in Texas
1949 natural disasters in the United States
Category 2 Atlantic hurricanes
1949 meteorology